The Serie B 1997–98 was the sixty-sixth tournament of this competition played in Italy since its creation.

Teams 
Treviso, Monza, Fidelis Andria and Ancona had been promoted from Serie C, while Cagliari, Perugia, Hellas Verona and Reggiana had been relegated from Serie A.

Final classification

Results

Promotion tie-breaker 

A.C. Perugia promoted to 1998–99 Serie A.

Top goalscorers 

Serie B seasons
2
Italy